Ruslans Mihaļčuks (born 10 August 1976, in Riga) is a football midfielder from Latvia who plays for FK Daugava Daugavpils in the Latvian First League.

External links

1976 births
Latvian footballers
FK Ventspils players
FC Daugava players
Latvia international footballers
Footballers from Riga
Living people
Association football midfielders